Zhang Xin (born 1954) is a Chinese author based in Guangzhou. Several of her novels have been adapted into films and TV series.

Works translated into English

Filmography

Film

TV series

References

Further reading

1954 births
Living people
Screenwriters from Beijing
Peking University alumni
Chinese women short story writers
Chinese women novelists
20th-century Chinese writers
21st-century Chinese writers
20th-century Chinese women writers
21st-century Chinese women writers
People's Republic of China novelists
People's Republic of China short story writers
Short story writers from Beijing